Cecilioides is a genus of very small, air-breathing land snails, terrestrial pulmonate gastropod mollusks in the family Ferussaciidae. 

Most of the species in this genus live some distance underground. They are usually blind. Because of their subterranean habitat and their small size, they can be difficult to find alive.

When fresh, the shells are transparent. After they have been empty some time in the soil, they usually become an opaque milky-white.

Species
Species within this genus include:
 Cecilioides acicula (Müller, 1774)
 † Cecilioides aciculella (Sandberger, 1872) 
 Cecilioides actoniana (Benoit, 1862)
 Cecilioides advena (Ancey, 1888)
 Cecilioides aperta (Guilding in Swainson, 1840)
 Cecilioides balanus (Reeve, 1850)
 Cecilioides barbozae (Maltzan, 1886)
 Cecilioides bensoni Gude, 1914 
 Cecilioides blandiana (Crosse, 1880)
 Cecilioides caledonica (Crosse, 1867)
 Cecilioides callipeplum (Connolly, 1923)
 Cecilioides clessini (Maltzan, 1886)
 Cecilioides connollyi Tomlin, 1943
 Cecilioides dicaprio Dourson, Caldwell & Dourson, 2018
 Cecilioides eucharista (Bourguignat, 1864)
 Cecilioides eulima (Lowe, 1854)
 Cecilioides gokweanus (O. Boettger, 1870)
 † Cecilioides grateloupi (Bourguignat, 1856) 
 Cecilioides gundlachi (Pfeiffer, 1850)
 Cecilioides iota (C. B. Adams, 1845)
 Cecilioides isseli (Paladilhe, 1872)
 Cecilioides janii (Strobel, 1855)
 Cecilioides jeskalovicensis A. J. Wagner, 1914
 Cecilioides jod Pilsbry, 1907
 Cecilioides kalawangaensis Dartevelle & Venmans, 1951
 Cecilioides manensis de Winter, 1990
 Cecilioides mauritiana (H. Adams, 1868)
 † Cecilioides munieri (Paladilhe, 1875) 
 Cecilioides nyctelia (Bourguignat, 1856)
 Cecilioides pergracilis Connolly, 1939
 Cecilioides petitiana (Benoit, 1862)
 Cecilioides raddei (O. Boettger, 1879)
 Cecilioides raphidia (Bourguignat, 1856)
 † Cecilioides senutae Pickford, 2009 
 Cecilioides sommeri (Ferreira & Coelho, 1971)
 Cecilioides spencei Dupuis, 1923
 Cecilioides stephaniana (Benoit, 1862)
 Cecilioides tribulationis (Preston, 1911)
 Cecilioides tumulorum (Bourguignat, 1856)
 Cecilioides veneta (Strobel, 1855)
 Cecilioides virgo (Preston, 1911)
Species brought into synonymy
 Cecilioides consobrina (d’Orbigny, 1842): synonym of Karolus consobrinus (d'Orbigny, 1841)
 † Cecilioides pseudocylichna (De Stefani, 1880): synonym of † Acicula pseudocylichna De Stefani, 1880

References

 Bank, R. A. (2017). Classification of the Recent terrestrial Gastropoda of the World. Last update: July 16th, 2017

External links

 Férussac, A.E.J.P.F. d'Audebard de. (1814). Mémoires géologiques sur les terreins formés sous l'eau douce par les débris fossiles des mollusques vivant sur la terre ou dans l'eau non salée. Paris: Poulet. 76 pp
 Hartmann, J.D.W. (1840-1844). Erd- und Süsswasser-Gasteropoden der Schweiz. Mit Zugabe einiger merkwürdigen exotischen Arten, i-xx, 1-36, pl. 1-2 [30-06-1840; 37-116, pl. 13-36 [1841]; 117-156, pl. 37-60 [1842]; 157-204, pl. 61-72 [1843]; 205-227, pl. 73-84 [1844]. St. Gallen]
 Risso A. (1826). Histoire naturelle des principales productions de l'Europe méridionale et particulièrement de celles des environs de Nice et des Alpes Maritimes, vol. 4. Paris: Levrault. vii + 439 pp., pls 1-12
 Swainson, W. (1840). A treatise on malacology or shells and shell-fish. London, Longman. viii + 419 pp.

Ferussaciidae
Taxonomy articles created by Polbot
Gastropod genera